This is an alphabetical index of articles related to architecture.

0–9

 4th millennium BC in architecture
 30th century BC in architecture
 29th century BC in architecture
 27th century BC in architecture
 26th century BC in architecture
 25th century BC in architecture
 21st century BC in architecture
 19th century BC in architecture
 18th century BC in architecture
 14th century BC in architecture
 13th century BC in architecture
 6th century BC in architecture
 5th century BC in architecture
 2nd century in architecture
 3rd century in architecture
 4th century in architecture
 5th century in architecture
 6th century in architecture
 7th century in architecture
 8th century in architecture
 9th century in architecture
 10th century in architecture
 11th century in architecture
 14th century in architecture
 1000s in architecture
 2000 in architecture

A 

 A-frame building
 A-un
 Abacus
 Ab anbar
 Abat-son
 Abbasid architecture
 Ablaq
 Acanthus
 Accolade
 Achaemenid architecture
 Acropolis
 Acroterion
 Adam style
 Adaptive reuse
 Additive Architecture
 Adirondack Architecture
 Adobe
 Advanced work
 Adyton
 Aedicula
 Aeolic order
 Aerary
 Aerospace architecture
 Affordable housing by country
 Affordable housing in Canada
 Afromodernism
 Agadir
 Airey house
 Aisle
 Akbari architecture
 Albarrana tower
 Alcazaba
 Alcázar
 Alcove
 Alfarje
 Alfiz
 Alure
 Amalaka
 Ambry
 Ambulacrum
 Ambulatory
 American colonial architecture
 American Foursquare
 American Renaissance
 Ammonite order
 Amphiprostyle
 Amphitheatre
 Amsterdam School
 Anastylosis
 Anathyrosis
 Anchor plate
 Ancient Chinese wooden architecture
 Ancient Egyptian architecture
 Ancient Greek and Roman roofs
 Ancient Greek architecture
 Ancient Greek temple
 Ancient Indian architecture
 Ancient monuments of Java
 Ancient Roman architecture
 Ancient Roman defensive walls
 Andalusian patio
 Andaruni
 Andean Baroque
 Andron
 Anglo-Japanese style
 Anglo-Saxon architecture
 Anglo-Saxon turriform churches
 Annulet
 Anta
 Anta capital
 Antarala
 Antae temple
 Antebellum architecture
 Antechamber
 Ante-chapel
 Ante-choir
 Antefix
 Apadana
 Apartment
 Apodyterium
 Apophyge
 Apron
 Apse
 Apse chapel
 Apsidiole
 Aqueduct
 Arabesque
 Araeostyle
 Arcachon villa
 Arcade
 Arch
 Arch bridge
 Architect
 Architects of Iran
 Architrave
 Archivolt
 Architect of record
 Architectural acoustics
 Architectural analytics
 Architectural animation
 Architectural conservation
 Architectural design competition
 Architectural design optimization
 Architectural design values
 Architectural designer
 Architectural development of the eastern end of cathedrals in England and France
 Architectural drawing
 Architectural education in the United Kingdom
 Architectural educator
 Architectural endoscopy
 Architectural engineer (PE)
 Architectural engineering
 Architectural Experience Program (AXP)
 Architectural forgery in Japan
 Architectural firm
 Architectural geometry
 Architectural glass
 Architectural Heritage Society of Scotland
 Architectural historian
 Architectural icon
 Architectural illustrator
 Architectural ironmongery
 Architectural light shelf
 Architectural lighting design
 Architectural metals
 Architectural model
 Architectural mythology
 Architectural photographers
 Architectural photography
 Architectural plan
 Architectural propaganda
 Architectural psychology in Germany
 Architectural rendering
 Architectural reprography
 Architectural Review
 Architectural school of Nakhchivan
 Architectural sculpture
 Architectural sculpture in the United States
 Architectural style
 Architectural technologist
 Architectural technology
 Architectural terracotta
 Architectural theory
 Architectural vaults
 Architecture
 Architecture for Humanity
 Architecture in early modern Scotland
 Architecture in modern Scotland
 Architecture in Omaha, Nebraska
 Architecture museum
 Architecture of Aarhus
 Architecture of Aberdeen
 Architecture of Afghanistan
 Architecture of Africa
 Architecture of Albania
 Architecture of Albany, New York
 Architecture of Algeria
 Architecture of Almaty
 Architecture of ancient Sri Lanka
 Architecture of Angola
 Architecture of Argentina
 Architecture of Atlanta
 Architecture of Australia
 Architecture of Aylesbury
 Architecture of Azerbaijan
 Architecture of Baku
 Architecture of Bangladesh
 Architecture of Barcelona
 Architecture of Bathurst, New South Wales
 Architecture of Belfast
 Architecture of Belgrade
 Architecture of Bengal
 Architecture of Berlin
 Architecture of Bermuda
 Architecture of Bhutan
 Architecture of Birmingham
 Architecture of Bolivia
 Architecture of Bosnia and Herzegovina
 Architecture of Boston
 Architecture of Brazil
 Architecture of Buffalo, New York
 Architecture of the Bulgarian Revival
 Architecture of the California missions
 Architecture of Canada
 Architecture of Cantabria
 Architecture of Cape Verde
 Architecture of Cardiff
 Architecture of Casablanca
 Architecture of cathedrals and great churches
 Architecture of Central Asia
 Architecture of Chennai
 Architecture of Chicago
 Architecture of Chile
 Architecture of Chiswick House
 Architecture of Colombia
 Architecture of Copenhagen
 Architecture of Costa Rica
 Architecture of Croatia
 Architecture of Cuba
 Architecture of the Cucuteni–Trypillia culture
 Architecture of Dakota Crescent
 Architecture of Delhi
 Architecture of Denmark
 Architecture of Dhaka
 Architecture of England
 Architecture of Estonia
 Architecture of Ethiopia
 Architecture of Fez
 Architecture of Fiji
 Architecture of Finland
 Architecture of Fredericksburg, Texas
 Architecture of Georgia
 Architecture of Germany
 Architecture of Glasgow
 Architecture of Goan Catholics
 Architecture of Gujarat
 Architecture of Hong Kong
 Architecture of Houston
 Architecture of Hungary
 Architecture of Hyderabad
 Architecture of Iceland
 Architecture of India
 Architecture of Indonesia
 Architecture of Ireland
 Architecture of Istanbul
 Architecture of Italy
 Architecture of Jacksonville
 Architecture of Jiangxi
 Architecture of Johannesburg
 Architecture of Jordan
 Architecture of Kansas City
 Architecture of Karnataka
 Architecture of Kathmandu
 Architecture of Kerala
 Architecture of Kievan Rus'
 Architecture of Kosovo
 Architecture of Kuala Lumpur
 Architecture of Kuwait
 Architecture of Lagos
 Architecture of Lahore
 Architecture of Las Vegas
 Architecture of Lebanon
 Architecture of Leeds
 Architecture of Letterkenny
 Architecture of Lhasa
 Architecture of Limerick
 Architecture of Liverpool
 Architecture of London
 Architecture of the London Borough of Croydon
 Architecture of Lucknow
 Architecture of Luxembourg
 Architecture of Macau
 Architecture of Madagascar
 Architecture of Madrid
 Architecture of Maharashtra
 Architecture of Mali
 Architecture of Malta
 Architecture of Manchester
 Architecture of Mangalorean Catholics
 Architecture of the medieval cathedrals of England
 Architecture of Melbourne
 Architecture of Mesopotamia
 Architecture of metropolitan Detroit
 Architecture of Mexico
 Architecture of Monaco
 Architecture of Mongolia
 Architecture of Montenegro
 Architecture of Montreal
 Architecture of Mostar
 Architecture of Mumbai
 Architecture of the Netherlands
 Architecture of Nepal
 Architecture of New York City
 Architecture of New Zealand
 Architecture of Nigeria
 Architecture of Normandy
 Architecture of North Macedonia
 Architecture of Norway
 Architecture of Ottawa
 Architecture of Paris
 Architecture of the Paris Métro
 Architecture of Palestine
 Architecture of Peć
 Architecture of Penang
 Architecture of Peru
 Architecture of Philadelphia
 Architecture of the Philippines
 Architecture of Plymouth, Pennsylvania
 Architecture of Portland, Oregon
 Architecture of Provence
 Architecture of Puerto Rico
 Architecture of Quebec
 Architecture of Quebec City
 Architecture of Rajasthan
 Architecture of Rome
 Architecture of Samoa
 Architecture of San Antonio
 Architecture of San Francisco
 Architecture of Saudi Arabia
 Architecture of Scotland
 Architecture of Scotland in the Industrial Revolution
 Architecture of Scotland in the Middle Ages
 Architecture of Scotland in the Prehistoric era
 Architecture of Scotland in the Roman era
 Architecture of Seattle
 Architecture of Serbia
 Architecture of Singapore
 Architecture of Sri Lanka
 Architecture of the Song dynasty
 Architecture of South Korea
 Architecture of St. John's, Newfoundland and Labrador
 Architecture of St. Louis
 Architecture of Stockholm
 Architecture of Sumatra
 Architecture of Sweden
 Architecture of Switzerland
 Architecture of Sydney
 Architecture of Taiwan
 Architecture of Tamil Nadu
 Architecture of the Tarnovo Artistic School
 Architecture of Tehran
 Architecture of Telangana
 Architecture of Texas
 Architecture of Thailand
 Architecture of Tibet
 Architecture of Tokyo
 Architecture of Toronto
 Architecture of Turkey
 Architecture of the Netherlands
 Architecture of the Paris Métro
 Architecture of the United Arab Emirates
 Architecture of the United Kingdom
 Architecture of the United States
 Architecture of Uttar Pradesh
 Architecture of Uzbekistan
 Architecture of Vancouver
 Architecture of Vatican City
 Architecture of Veliko Tarnovo
 Architecture of Wales
 Architecture of Warsaw
 Architecture of Western Australia
 Architecture of Yugoslavia
 Architecture of Zimbabwe
 Architecture parlante
 Architecture schools in Switzerland
 Architecture studio
 Architecture terrible
 Architrave
 Archivolt
 Arcology
 Arcosolium
 Ardhamandapa
 Area
 Arena
 Armenian architecture
 Armenian church architecture
 Arris
 Arrowslit
 Art Deco
 Art Deco architecture
 Art Deco architecture of New York City
 Art Deco in Mumbai
 Art Deco in Paris
 Art Deco in the United States
 Art Deco buildings in Sydney
 Art Nouveau
 Art Nouveau architecture in Riga
 Art Nouveau architecture in Russia
 Art Nouveau in Alcoy
 Art Nouveau in Antwerp
 Art Nouveau in Strasbourg
 Art Nouveau religious buildings
 Artesonado
 Articular church
 Articulation
 Ashlar
 Assam-type architecture
 Association of German Architects
 Astragal
 Asturian architecture
 Astylar
 Atalburu
 Atlantean figures
 Atlas
 Atmosphere
 Atrium
 Attap dwelling
 Attic
 Attic base
 Attic style
 Aula regia
 Australian architectural styles
 Australian non-residential architectural styles
 Australian residential architectural styles
 Autonomous building
 Avant-garde architecture
 Avant-corps
 Awning
 Azekurazukuri
 Aztec architecture

B 

 Barabara
 Bachelor of Architectural Studies
 Bachelor of Architecture
 Back-to-back house
 Badami Chalukya architecture
 Bailey
 Baita
 Balairung
 Balconet
 Balconies of Cusco
 Balconies of Lima
 Balcony
 Bald arch
 Baldachin
 Baldresca
 Bale kulkul
 Bali Aga architecture
 Balinese architecture
 Balinese traditional house
 Ball flower
 Baluster
 Banjarese architecture
 Banna'i
 Banqueting house
 Banquette
 Baptistery
 Baradari
 Barbican
 Bargeboard
 Bargrennan chambered cairn
 Barndominium
 Baroque architecture
 Baroque architecture in Portugal
 Baroque Revival architecture
 Barrel roof
 Barrel vault
 Bartizan
 Baseboard
 Basement
 Basilica
 Bastide (Provençal manor)
 Bastion
 Bastion fort
 Bastle house
 Batak architecture
 Batter
 Battered corner
 Battle of the Styles
 Battlement
 Baubotanik
 Bauhaus
 Bay
 Bay-and-gable
 Bay window
 Beach house
 Bead and reel
 Beaux-Arts architecture
 Bed-mould
 Beehive house
 Belarusian Gothic
 Belfry
 Bell-cot
 Bell-gable
 Bell roof
 Bell tower
 Bell tower (wat)
 Belsize Architects
 Belt course
 Belvedere
 Bench table
 Bent
 Bent entrance
 Berg house
 Béton brut
 Bezantée
 Biedermeier
 Bifora
 Bildts farmhouse
 Biomimetic architecture
 Bionic architecture
 Black and white bungalow
 Black-and-white Revival architecture
 Black Forest house
 Blackhouse
 Blind arcade
 Blind arch
 Blobitecture
 Blockhouse
 Blue roof
 Bolection
 Bond beam
 Bosnian style in architecture
 Boss
 Bossage
 Bossche School
 Bouleuterion
 Bowellism
 Bowtell
 Bow window
 Box gutter
 Brabantine Gothic
 Bracket
 Brahmasthan
 Branchwork
 Brâncovenesc style
 Brattishing
 Breezeway
 Bresse house
 Bressummer
 Bretèche
 Brick Expressionism
 Brick Gothic
 Brick Gothic buildings
 Brick nog
 Brick Renaissance
 Brick Romanesque buildings
 Brickwork
 Bridge castle
 Brief
 Brise soleil
 Bristol Byzantine
 British megalith architecture
 Broach spire
 Broch
 Brutalist architecture
 Brutalist structures
 Bucranium
 Buddhist architecture
 Building
 Building code
 Building design
 Building envelope
 Building restoration
 Building typology
 Buildings and architecture of Allentown, Pennsylvania
 Buildings and architecture of Bath
 Buildings and architecture of Brighton and Hove
 Buildings and architecture of Bristol 
 Buildings and architecture of New Orleans
 Buildings in Dubai
 Burdock piling
 Burgus
 Burnham Baroque
 But and ben
 Butterfly roof
 Buttress
 Byre-dwelling
 Byzantine architecture
 Byzantine Revival architecture

C 

 Caisson
 Caldarium
 Calendar house
 California bungalow
 Camarín
 Camber beam
 Cambridge School of Architecture and Landscape Architecture
 Canada's grand railway hotels
 Canadian Centre for Architecture
 Candi bentar
 Candi of Indonesia
 Canopy
 Cant
 Cantilever
 Cantoris
 Cape Dutch architecture
 Capilla abierta
 Capilla posa
 Capital
 Caravanserai
 Carolingian architecture
 Carpenter Gothic
 Carport
 Cartilage Baroque
 Cartouche
 Caryatid
 Casa montañesa
 Cascina a corte
 Cas di torto
 Casemate
 Casement stay
 Casement window
 Castellum
 Cast-iron architecture
 Castle
 Castle chapel
 Cast stone
 Catalan Gothic
 Catalan Romanesque Churches of the Vall de Boí
 Catalan vault
 Catenary arch
 Cathedral
 Cathedral arch
 Cathedral Architect
 Cathedral floorplan
 Cathedrals in Spain
 Catshead (architecture)
 Cavaedium
 Cavalier
 Cave castle
 Cavea
 Cavetto
 Cavity wall
 Ceiling
 Cella
 Cell church
 Cenotaph
 Central-passage house
 Centring
 Ceramic house
 Chahartaq
 Chalet
 Chamber gate
 Chamber tomb
 Chambered cairn
 Chambranle
 Chamfer
 Chancel
 Channel letters
 Chantlate
 Chapel
 Chapter house
 Chardak
 Charleston single house
 Charrette
 Chartaque
 Charter bole
 Chartered architect
 Château
 Châteauesque
 Chattel house
 Chemin de ronde
 Chemise
 Cherokee Gothic
 Chhajja
 Chhatri
 Chicago school
 Chigi
 Chilotan architecture
 Chimney
 Chimney breast
 Chinese architecture
 Chinese Chippendale
 Chinese Islamic architecture
 Chinese pagoda
 Chinese temple architecture
 Choga
 Choir
 Chola art and architecture
 Church architecture
 Church architecture in England
 Church architecture in Scotland
 Church window
 Churches in Norway
 Churches of Chiloé
 Churrigueresque
 Ciborium
 Circulation
 Circus
 Cistercian architecture
 Citadel
 City Beautiful movement
 City block
 City gate
 City of Vicenza and the Palladian Villas of the Veneto
 Clapboard
 Classical architecture
 Classical order
 Clerestory
 Clerk of works
 Cliff dwelling
 Clock gable
 Cloister
 Cloister vault
 Coade stone
 Cobblestone architecture
 Coenaculum
 Coercion castle
 Coffer
 Collegiate Gothic
 Colonette
 Colonial architecture
 Colonial architecture in Jakarta
 Colonial architecture in Padang
 Colonial architecture in Surabaya
 Colonial architecture of Indonesia
 Colonial architecture of Makassar
 Colonial architecture of Southeast Asia
 Colonial Revival architecture
 Colonnade
 Column
 Comacine masters
 Combination stair
 Compass
 Complementary architecture
 Compound pier
 Compression member
 Computer-aided architectural design
 Comtois steeple
 Concatenation
 Concentric castle
 Conceptual architecture
 Conch house
 Concrete landscape curbing
 Concrete shell
 Congrès Internationaux d'Architecture Moderne
 Conical roof
 Conisterium
 Connected farm
 Construction partnering
 Constructivist architecture
 Consumption wall
 Contemporary architecture
 Contextual architecture
 Conversation pit
 Coping
 Copper cladding
 Copper in architecture
 Coptic architecture
 Copyright in architecture in the United States
 Corbel
 Corbel arch
 Cordonata
 Core
 Corinthian order
 Cornerstone
 Corner tower
 Cornice
 Coron
 Corps de logis
 Cosmatesque
 Cotswold architecture
 Cottage flat
 Cottage orné
 Cottage window
 Council architect
 Council on Tall Buildings and Urban Habitat
 Counter-arch
 Coupled column
 Cour d'honneur
 Course 
 Court cairn	
 Courtyard house
 Cove lighting
 Coved ceiling
 Covertway
 Crannog
 Creole architecture in the United States
 Crepidoma
 Crescent
 Cresting
 Crimson Architectural Historians
 Crinkle crankle wall
 Critical regionalism
 Croatian pre-Romanesque art and architecture
 Crocket
 Crooked spire
 Cross-in-square
 Cross-wall
 Cross-window
 Cross-wing
 Crossing
 Crowdsourcing architecture
 Crown molding
 Crown steeple
 Crownwork
 Cruciform
 Crypt
 Cryptoporticus
 Cubiculum
 Curtain wall
 Cyclopean masonry
 Cyclostyle
 Cymatium
 Cyzicene hall
 Czech architecture
 Czech Baroque architecture
 Czech Cubism
 Czech Gothic architecture
 Czech Renaissance architecture

D 

 Dado
 Dado rail
 Daibutsuyō
 Dakkah
 Danish design
 Darbazi
 Dargah
 Dartmoor longhouse
 Deck
 Deconstruction
 Deconstructivism
 Deep foundation
 Deep Jyoti Stambh
 Deep plan
 Defensive wall
 Defensive towers of Cantabria
 Demerara window
 Dentil
 Destruction of country houses in 20th-century Britain
 Detinets
 Diagrid
 Diamond vault
 Diapering
 Diaphragm arch
 Diaulos
 Digital architecture
 Dikka
 Diocletian window
 Discharging arch
 Disordered piling
 Dissenting Gothic
 Distyle
 Distyle in antis
 Dō
 Doctor of Architecture
 Dog-tooth
 Dome
 Domus
 Doric order
 Dormer
 Double chapel
 Double-skin facade
 Dougong
 Dragestil
 Dravidian architecture
 Drawing board
 Dropped ceiling
 Drum tower
 Dry stone
 Dun
 Duomo
 Duplex (building)
 Dutch architecture in Semarang
 Dutch Baroque architecture
 Dutch brick
 Dutch Colonial architecture
 Dutch Colonial Revival architecture
 Dutch door
 Dutch gable
 Dwarf gallery
 Dzong architecture

E 

 Early Christian art and architecture
 Early New York Architecture in 19th Century
 Early skyscrapers
 Earthquake Baroque
 East Asian hip-and-gable roof
 Easter Sepulchre
 Eastern Orthodox church architecture
 Eastlake movement
 Eave return
 Eaves
 Eclecticism in architecture
 Edwardian architecture
 Edwardian Baroque architecture
 Egg-and-dart
 Egyptian pyramids
 Egyptian pyramid construction techniques
 Egyptian Revival architecture
 Egyptian Revival architecture in the British Isles
 Elevated entrance
 Elizabethan architecture
 Elizabethan Baroque 
 Ell
 Ellipsoidal dome
 Elliptical dome
 Embrasure
 Emissary
 Empire style
 Enceinte
 Enclosure castle
 Enfilade
 Engaged column
 Engawa
 English Baroque
 English country house
 English Gothic architecture
 Entablature
 Entasis
 Ergastulum
 Estate houses in Scotland
 Estipite
 Estonian vernacular architecture
 Etruscan architecture
 European medieval architecture in North America
 European Route of Brick Gothic
 European Union Prize for Contemporary Architecture
 Euthynteria
 Examination for Architects in Canada
 Exedra
 Experimental architecture
 Expression
 Expressionist architecture

F 

 Fabric structure
 Facade
 Facadism
 False door
 Falsework
 Fanlight
 Fan vault
 Fantastic architecture
 Farmhouse
 Fascia
 Fascist architecture
 Fatimid architecture
 Fatimid Great Palaces
 Fauces
 Faussebraye
 Federal architecture
 Federal modernism
 Federation architecture
 Fender pier
 Ferro
 Festoon
 Fina
 Finial
 Firebox
 Fire door
 Fire lookout tower
 Firewall
 First national architectural movement
 First Period
 First Romanesque
 Flak tower
 Flamboyant
 Flame palmette
 Flanking tower
 Flat roof
 Flèche (architecture)
 Flèche (fortification)
 Flèche faîtière
 Fleuron
 Float glass
 Floating floor
 Flood arch
 Floor medallion
 Floor plan
 Floor vibration
 Florida cracker architecture
 Florida modern
 Flushwork
 Fluting (architecture)
 Flying arch
 Flying buttress
 Foil
 Folk Victorian
 Folly
 Folly fort
 Forced perspective
 Forecourt
 Form follows function
 Fortification
 Fortified gateway
 Fortified house
 Fortified tower
 Fortochka
 Fortress church
 Forum
 Foundation
 Four-centred arch
 Frederician Rococo
 Free plan
 French architecture
 French Baroque architecture
 French Colonial
 French Gothic architecture
 French Renaissance architecture
 French Restoration style
 French Romanesque architecture
 Frëngji
 Fretwork
 Frieze
 Frigidarium
 Frisian farmhouse
 Frontispiece
 Fumarium
 Funco
 Functionalism
 Fusuma

G 

 Gabion
 Gable
 Gablefront house
 Gable roof
 Gablet roof
 Gable stone
 Gaiola
 Galilee
 Gallery
 Galleting
 Gambrel
 Gaper
 Garbhagriha
 Garderobe
 Gargoyle
 Garland bearers
 Garret
 Garrison
 Gatehouse
 Gate tower
 Gavaksha
 Gavit
 Gazebo
 Geestharden house
 Geison
 Genius loci
 Geodesic dome
 Georgian architecture
 Gibbs surround
 Gingerbread
 Girih
 Girih tiles
 Girt
 Giyōfū architecture
 Glass brick
 Glass floor
 Glass in green buildings
 Glass mosaic
 Glass mullion system
 Glass tile
 Glazed architectural terra-cotta
 Glazing
 Gloriette
 Gold leaf
 Gonbad
 Gongbei
 Gothic architecture
 Gothic architecture in Lithuania
 Gothic architecture in modern Poland
 Gothic brick buildings in Germany
 Gothic brick buildings in the Netherlands
 Gothic buildings
 Gothic cathedrals and churches
 Gothic Revival architecture
 Gothic Revival architecture in Canada
 Gothic Revival architecture in Poland
 Gothic Revival buildings
 Gothic secular and domestic architecture
 Goût grec
 Grade beam
 Graecostasis
 Granary
 Grands Projets of François Mitterrand
 Great chamber
 Great hall
 Great house
 Great Rebuilding
 Great room
 Greek Baths
 Greek Revival architecture
 Green building
 Gridshell
 Grille (architecture)
 Grillwork
 Groin vault
 Grotesque
 Grotto
 Gründerzeit
 Guard stone
 Guard tower
 Guastavino tile
 Guerrilla architecture
 Gulf house
 Gutta
 Gymnasium
 Gynaeceum

H 

 Hachiman-zukuri
 Hagioscope
 Haiden
 Hakka walled village
 Half tower
 Hall
 Hall and parlor house
 Hall church
 Hall house
 Hammerbeam roof
 Han dynasty tomb architecture
 Hanover school of architecture
 Harappan architecture
 Harling
 Hasht-behesht
 Hashti
 Haubarg
 Hausa architecture
 Hawaiian architecture
 Hay hood
 Heiden
 Heimatschutz
 Heliopolis style
 Heliotrope
 Hemadpanti architecture
 Henry II style
 Henry IV style
 Heritage houses in Sydney
 Heritage structures in Chennai 
 Herma
 Herodian architecture
 Heroon
 Herrerian style
 Herzog & de Meuron
 Hexafoil
 Hexagonal window
 Hidden roof
 High-rise building
 High-tech architecture
 High Victorian Gothic
 Hill castle
 Hillfort
 Hillforts in Scotland
 Hillside castle
 Hilltop castle
 Hindu and Buddhist architectural heritage of Pakistan
 Hindu architecture
 Hindu temple architecture
 Hip roof
 Hippodrome
 Hirairi
 Hisashi
 Historic house
 Historicism
 History of architectural engineering
 History of architecture
 History of domes in South Asia
 History of early and simple domes
 History of early modern period domes
 History of Italian Renaissance domes
 History of medieval Arabic and Western European domes
 History of modern period domes 	
 History of the world's tallest buildings
 History of urban planning
 Hiyoshi-zukuri
 Hoarding
 Hogan
 Hokkien architecture
 Hokora
 Honden
 Hood mould
 Hórreo
 Horreum
 Horseshoe arch
 Hosh
 Hostile architecture
 Hôtel particulier
 House
 Housebarn
 House-commune
 House plan
 Housing in Azerbaijan
 Housing in China
 Housing in Europe
 Housing in Glasgow
 Housing in Hong Kong
 Housing in India
 Housing in Japan
 Housing in New Zealand
 Housing in Pakistan
 Housing in Portugal
 Housing in Scotland
 Housing in Senegal
 Housing in the United Kingdom
 Howz
 Hoysala architecture
 Huabiao
 Hui-style architecture
 Hunky punk
 Hypaethral
 Hyphen
 Hypocaust
 Hypostyle
 Hypotrachelium

I 
 	
 I-house
 Iberian pre-Romanesque art and architecture
 Ice house
 Icelandic turf house
 Iconostasis
 Ideal town
 Illusionistic ceiling painting
 Imbrex and tegula
 Imperial castle
 Imperial Crown Style
 Imperial roof decoration
 Imperial staircase
 Impluvium
 Impluvium (house)
 Impost
 Inca architecture
 Indented corners
 Indian rock-cut architecture
 Indian vernacular architecture
 Indies Empire style
 Indigenous architecture
 Indo-Corinthian capital
 Indo-Islamic architecture
 Indo-Saracenic architecture
 Industrial architecture
 Infill wall
 Inglenook
 Insula (building)
 Insula (Roman city)
 Interactive architecture
 Intercolumniation
 Interior architecture
 Intern architect
 Intern Architect Program
 International Gothic
 International Style
 International Union of Architects
 Interstitial space
 Inverted arch
 Inverted bell
 Inverted pyramid
 Ionic order
 Ipswich window
 Iranian architecture
 Irish round tower
 Iron railing
 Irori
 Isabelline
 Isfahani style
 Ishi-no-ma-zukuri
 Islamic architecture
 Islamic geometric patterns
 Island castle
 Italian Baroque architecture
 Italian Gothic architecture
 Italian modern and contemporary architecture
 Italian Neoclassical architecture
 Italianate architecture
 Iwan
 Izba

J 

 Jacal
 Jack arch
 Jacobean architecture
 Jagati
 Jali
 Jamaican Georgian architecture
 Jama masjid
 Jamb
 Jamb statue
 Japan Institute of Architects
 Japanese architecture
 Japanese Buddhist architecture
 Japanese pagoda
 Japanese wall
 Japanese-Western Eclectic Architecture
 Javanese traditional house
 Jeffersonian architecture
 Jengki style
 Jesmonite
 Jettying
 Jharokha
 Joglo
 Jugendstil
 Jutaku

K 

 Kadamba architecture
 Kagura-den
 Kairō
 Kalae house
 Kalang house
 Kalinga architecture
 Kalybe (temple)
 Karahafu
 Karamon
 Kasbah
 Kasuga-zukuri
 Kath kuni architecture
 Katōmado
 Katsuogi
 Keep
 Keystone
 Khmer architecture
 Khorasani style
 Khrushchyovka
 Kibitsu-zukuri
 Kinetic architecture
 King post
 Kit house
 Kiva
 Kliros
 Knee
 Knee wall
 Knotted column
 Koil
 Kokoshnik architecture
 Komainu
 Konak
 Korean architecture
 Korean pagoda
 Kraton
 Kremlin
 Kucheh
 Kura
 Kuruwa
 Kyōzō

L 

 L-plan castle
 Labrum
 Laconicum
 Lally column
 Lamolithic house
 Lanai
 Lancet window
 Landhuis
 Landscape architect 
 Landscript
 Lantern tower
 Latina
 Lattice tower
 Latticework
 Lesene
 Leuit
 Levantine Gothic
 Liberty style
 Library stack
 Lierne
 Lightwell
 Lime plaster
 Limes
 Linenfold
 Lingnan architecture
 Linhay
 Linked house
 Lintel
 Listed building
 Liwan
 Lobby
 Loculus
 Log building
 Log cabin
 Log house
 Loggia
 Lombard architecture
 Lombard band
 London Festival of Architecture
 Long barrow
 Long gallery
 Longhouse
 Longhouses of the indigenous peoples of North America
 Lookout
 Lopo house
 Lorraine house
 Louis period styles
 Louis XIII style
 Louis XIV style
 Louis XV style
 Louis XVI style
 Louis Philippe style
 Louver
 Low-energy house
 Low German house
 Lowland castle
 Low-rise building
 Lucarne
 Lunette
 Lunette (fortification)
 Luten arch

M 

 Maashaus
 Machiya
 Machicolation
 Maenianum
 Mahal
 Maharishi Vastu Architecture
 Mahoney tables
 Main Hall
 Major town houses of the architect Victor Horta (Brussels)
 Malay house
 Maltese Baroque architecture
 Mamluk architecture
 Mammisi
 Mandaloun
 Mandapa
 Mannerism
 Manor house
 Mansard roof
 Mansion
 Mansionization
 Manueline
 Manufactured housing
 Maqam
 Maqsurah
 Mar del Plata style
 Margent
 Marine architecture
 Marriage stone
 Marsh castle
 Martello tower
 Martyrium
 Māru-Gurjara architecture
 Mas (Provençal farmhouse)
 Mascaron
 Mashrabiya
 Masia
 Massing
 Mastaba
 Master of Architecture
 Materiality
 Mathematical tile
 Mathematics and architecture
 Mathura lion capital
 Matroneum
 Mausoleum
 Maya architecture
 Mayan Revival architecture
 Mead hall
 Meander
 Medallion
 Medici villas
 Medieval architecture
 Medieval fortification
 Medieval Serbian architecture 
 Medieval stained glass
 Medieval turf building in Cronberry
 Mediterranean Revival architecture
 Megalithic architectural elements
 Megaron
 Megastructure
 Meitei architecture
 Membrane structure
 Memorial gates and arches
 Mendicant monasteries in Mexico
 Merlon
 Merovingian art and architecture
 Meru tower
 Mesoamerican architecture
 Mesoamerican ballcourt
 Mesoamerican pyramids
 Metabolism
 Metaphoric architecture
 Metope
 Metroon
 Mezzanine
 Miami Modern architecture
 Microdistrict
 Mid-century modern
 Middle German house
 Mihashira Torii
 Mihrab
 Minaret
 Minimal Traditional
 Minka
 Minstrels' gallery
 Mission Revival architecture
 Mithraeum
 Model maker
 Modern architecture
 Modern architecture in Athens
 Modern Greek architecture
 Moderne architecture
 Modernisme
 Modillion
 Modular building
 Mokoshi
 Moldavian style
 Molding
 Mole
 Mon
 Monaco villas
 Mondop
 Monitor
 Monofora
 Monolithic architecture
 Monolithic church
 Monolithic column
 Monolithic dome
 Mono-pitched roof
 Monopteros
 Monterey Colonial architecture
 Monumental sculpture
 Monumentalism
 Moon gate
 Moorish architecture
 Moorish Revival architecture
 Moorish Revival architecture in Bosnia and Herzegovina
 Morava architectural school
 Moroccan architecture
 Moroccan riad
 Moroccan style
 Morphology
 Mosaic
 Mosque
 Motte-and-bailey castle
 Motte-and-bailey castles
 Mozarabic art and architecture
 Mudéjar
 Mudéjar architecture of Aragon
 Mughal architecture
 Muisca architecture
 Mullion
 Mullion wall
 Multi-family residential
 Multifoil arch
 Muntin
 Muqarnas
 Muragala
 Murder hole
 Musalla
 Museum architecture
 Musgum mud huts
 Myanmar architecture
 Mycenaean Revival architecture

N 

 Nabataean architecture
 Nagare-zukuri
 Naiskos
 Nakazonae
 Namako wall
 Nano House
 Napoleon III style
 Naqqar khana
 Narthex
 Naryshkin Baroque
 National Aptitude Test in Architecture
 National Park Service rustic
 National Romantic style
 Natural building
 Nave
 Nazi architecture
 Neck ditch
 Neo-Andean
 Neo-Byzantine architecture in the Russian Empire
 Neo-eclectic architecture
 Neo-futurism
 Neo-Grec
 Neo-historism
 Neo-Manueline
 Neomodern
 Neo-Mudéjar
 Neo-Tiwanakan architecture
 Neoclásico Isabelino
 Neoclassical architecture
 Neoclassical architecture in Belgium
 Neoclassical architecture in Milan
 Neoclassical architecture in Poland
 Neoclassical architecture in Russia
 Neoclassicism in France
 Neolithic architecture
 Neolithic long house
 Neorion
 New Classical architecture
 New Formalism (architecture)
 New Hague School
 New Indies Style
 New Khmer Architecture
 New Mexico vernacular
 New Objectivity
 New Spanish Baroque
 New Urbanism
 Newa architecture
 Newar window
 Newel
 Niche
 Nieuwe Zakelijkheid
 Nightingale floor
 Nijūmon
 Nilachal architecture
 Niōmon
 Nipa hut
 Nocturnal architecture
 Nonbuilding structure types
 Non-Referential Architecture
 Nordic Classicism
 Nordic megalith architecture
 Norman architecture
 Norman architecture in Cheshire
 Norman Revival architecture
 North light
 North-Western Italian architecture
 Novelty architecture
 Nubian architecture
 Nubian vault
 Nuraghe
 Nymphaeum

O 

 Ōbaku Zen architecture
 Obelisk
 Observation deck
 Observation tower
 Octagon house
 Octagon on cube
 Oculus
 Odeon
 Oecus
 Oeil-de-boeuf
 Ogee
 Ogive
 Okinawan architecture
 Old Frisian farmhouse
 Old Frisian longhouse
 Oldest buildings in Scotland
 One-day votive churches
 Onigawara
 Onion dome
 Open building
 Open plan
 Openwork
 Opisthodomos
 Opus
 Opus africanum
 Opus albarium
 Opus compositum
 Opus craticum
 Opus emplectum
 Opus gallicum
 Opus incertum
 Opus isodomum
 Opus latericium
 Opus listatum
 Opus mixtum
 Opus quadratum
 Opus regulatum
 Opus reticulatum
 Opus sectile
 Opus signinum
 Opus spicatum
 Opus tessellatum
 Opus testaceum
 Opus vermiculatum
 Opus vittatum
 Orangery
 Order
 Organic architecture
 Oriel window
 Origins and architecture of the Taj Mahal
 Orillon
 Ornamentalism
 Orri
 Orthostates
 Ottoman architecture
 Ottoman architecture in Egypt
 Overhang
 Overlay architecture
 Ovolo

P 

 Padmasana
 Paduraksa
 Pagoda
 Pair-house
 Pakistani architecture
 Palace
 Palaestra
 Palas
 Palazzo
 Palazzo style architecture
 Palisade church
 Palladian architecture
 Palladio Award
 Pallava art and architecture
 Palloza
 Palmette
 Pandyan art and architecture
 Paned window
 Panelák
 Panelling
 Panjdari
 Parabolic arch
 Paraguayan architecture
 Parametricism
 Parapet
 Parclose screen
 Pargeting
 Paris architecture of the Belle Époque 
 Parlour
 Parthenon
 Parthian style
 Parti pris
 Party wall
 Parvise
 Pataliputra capital
 Patera
 Patina
 Patio
 Patio home
 Pattern
 Pattern book
 Pattern language
 Paulista School
 Pavement
 Pavilion
 Pavilion (exhibition)
 Peak ornament
 Pedestal
 Pediment
 Pedimental sculpture
 Pedway
 Peel tower
 Pelmet
 Pend
 Pendant vault
 Pendentive
 Pendhapa
 Performative architecture
 Pergola
 Peribolos
 Peripteros
 Peristasis
 Peristyle
 Perpend stone
 Perron
 Perserschutt
 Persian column
 Peruvian colonial architecture
 Petrine Baroque
 Phallic architecture
 Phenomenology
 Phiale
 Philosophy of architecture
 Piano nobile
 Pier
 Pierrotage
 Pieve
 Pila
 Pilae stacks
 Pilaster
 Piloti
 Pinnacle
 Pit-house
 Place-of-arms
 Plafond
 Plan
 Plank house
 Plantagenet style
 Plateresque
 Plattenbau
 Plot plan
 Pluteus
 Plyscraper
 Podium
 Pointed arch
 Polifora
 Polish Cathedral style
 Polished plaster
 Polite architecture
 Polychrome
 Polychrome brickwork
 Polygonal fort
 Polygonal masonry
 Pombaline style
 Ponce Creole
 Pont Street Dutch
 Porch
 Portal
 Portcullis
 Porte-cochère
 Portego
 Portico
 Porticus
 Porto School of Architecture
 Portuguese Architecture
 Portuguese colonial architecture
 Portuguese Gothic architecture
 Portuguese Romanesque architecture
 Post
 Post and lintel
 Post-and-plank
 Post church
 Post in ground
 Postconstructivism
 Postern
 Postmodern architecture
 Poteaux-sur-sol
 Poupou
 Prairie School
 Pranala
 Prang
 Prasat
 Prastara
 Prefabricated building
 Prefabricated home
 Prefabs in the United Kingdom
 Prehistoric pile dwellings around the Alps 
 Pre-Parsian style
 Pre-Romanesque art and architecture
 Pre-war architecture
 Primitive Hut
 Pritzker Architecture Prize
 Prodigy house
 Professional requirements for architects
 Project architect
 Promenade architecturale
 Promontory fort
 Proportion
 Propylaea
 Prospect 100 best modern Scottish buildings
 Prostyle
 Prow house
 Prytaneion
 Pseudodipteral
 Pseudoperipteros
 Pteron
 Pucca housing
 Pueblo Deco architecture
 Pueblo Revival architecture
 Pullman
 Pulpitum
 Pulvino
 Purism
 Purlin
 Puteal
 Putlog hole
 Puuc
 PWA Moderne
 Pyatthat
 Pylon
 Pyramidion

Q 

 Qa'a
 Qadad
 Qalat
 Quadrangle
 Quadrangular castle
 Quadrant
 Quadrifora
 Quarry-faced stone
 Quarter round
 Quatrefoil
 Quattrocento
 Queen Anne Revival architecture in the United Kingdom
 Queen Anne style architecture
 Queen Anne style architecture in the United States
 Queenslander
 Quincha
 Quoin
 Qutb Shahi architecture

R 

 Rafter
 Raised floor
 Rampart
 Ranch-style house
 Rangkiang
 Raška architectural school
 Ratha
 Rationalism
 Raygun Gothic
 Rayonnant
 Realism
 Reconstruction
 Redoubt
 Reduit
 Reeding
 Reflecting pool
 Refuge castle
 Regency architecture
 Regia
 Regional characteristics of Romanesque churches
 Reglet
 Regulating Lines
 Reinforced concrete column
 Relief
 Religious architecture in Belgrade
 Religious architecture in Novi Sad
 Renaissance architecture
 Renaissance Revival architecture
 Repoblación art and architecture
 Residence
 Residential architecture in Historic Cairo
 Residential architecture in Ibiza
 Resort architecture
 Respond
 Responsive architecture
 Retaining wall
 Retractable roof
 Retrofuturism
 Retroquire
 Rhenish helm
 Revenue house
 Revivalism
 Revolving door
 RIBA Competitions
 RIBA Journal
 Ribat
 Rib vault
 Richardsonian Romanesque
 Ridge castle
 Ridge-post framing
 Ridge turret
 Rim joist
 Rinceau
 Ringfort
 Riwaq
 Rocca
 Rock castle
 Rock-cut architecture
 Rock-cut architecture of Cappadocia
 Rococo architecture in Portugal
 Rococo in Spain
 Roman amphitheatre
 Roman aqueduct
 Roman architectural revolution
 Roman brick
 Roman bridge
 Roman canal
 Roman cistern
 Roman concrete
 Roman dams and reservoirs
 Roman domes 
 Roman shower
 Roman temple
 Roman theatre
 Roman villa
 Romanesque architecture
 Romanesque architecture in Poland
 Romanesque architecture in Sardinia
 Romanesque architecture in Spain
 Romanesque buildings
 Romanesque churches in Madrid
 Romanesque Revival architecture in the United Kingdom
 Romanesque secular and domestic architecture
 Romanian architecture
 Romano-Gothic
 Rōmon
 Rondavel
 Rondocubism
 Roof comb
 Roof garden
 Roof lantern
 Roofline
 Roof pitch
 Roof window
 Rood screen
 Room
 Rorbu
 Rosette
 Rose window
 Roshandan
 Rostra
 Rostral column
 Rota
 Rotunda
 Round barn
 Roundel
 Roundhouse
 Round-tower church
 Royal Gold Medal
 Royal Institute of British Architects
 Ruin value
 Ruins
 Rumah Gadang
 Rumah limas
 Rumah ulu
 Rumoh Aceh
 Rundbogenstil
 Russian architecture
 Russian church architecture
 Russian cultural heritage register
 Russian neoclassical revival
 Russian Revival architecture
 Rustication

S 

 Sacellum
 Sacral architecture
 Saddle roof
 Saddleback roof
 Sahn
 Sail shade
 Saka guru
 Sakuji-bugyō
 Sala
 Sally port
 Saltbox house
 Sand Hills cottage architecture
 Sandō
 Sanmon
 Sarasota School of Architecture
 Sarnath capital
 Sasak architecture
 Sasanian architecture
 Sash window
 Scaenae frons
 Scagliola
 Scamilli impares
 Scarsella
 Schinkel school
 Scissors truss
 Sconce
 Scottish baronial architecture
 Scottish castles
 Scottish Vernacular
 Screened porch
 Scroll
 Seattle box
 Sebil
 Second Empire architecture in Europe
 Second Empire architecture in the United States and Canada
 Secondary suite
 Secret passage
 Secular building
 Sedilia
 Segmental arch
 Self-cleaning floor
 Self-cleaning glass
 Seljuk architecture
 Semi-basement
 Semi-detached
 Semi-dome
 Serbian wooden churches
 Serbo-Byzantine architecture
 Serbo-Byzantine Revival
 Serpentine shape
 Setback
 Setchūyō
 Set-off
 Sexpartite vault
 Shabaka
 Shabestan
 Shah Jahan period architecture
 Shallow foundation
 Shanxi architecture
 Shear wall
 Shed style
 Shell keep
 Shibi
 Shinbashira
 Shinden-zukuri
 Shingle style architecture
 Shinmei-zukuri
 Shinto architecture
 Shinto shrine
 Shipping container architecture
 Shipping container clinic
 Shitomi
 Shoebox style
 Shoin-zukuri
 Shōji
 Shophouse
 Shōrō
 Shotgun house
 Siberian Baroque
 Sicilian Baroque
 Side-deck
 Side passage plan architecture
 Sikh architecture
 Silesian architecture
 Sill plate
 Sima
 Single- and double-pen architecture
 Single-family detached home
 Sino-Portuguese architecture
 Site plan
 Site-specific architecture
 Skylight
 Skyscraper Index
 Skyway
 Slab hut
 Sleeping porch
 Slenderness ratio
 Slipcover
 Sliver building
 Slow architecture
 Smoke hole
 Snout house
 Sobrado
 Sociology of architecture
 Socle
 Soffit
 Soft Portuguese style
 Solar
 Solar architecture
 Solar chimney
 Solarized architectural glass
 Solomonic column
 Somali architecture
 Sōmon
 Sondergotik
 Sopo
 Sōrin
 Sotoportego
 Southern Colonial style in California
 Southern French Gothic
 Spa architecture
 Space
 Space architecture
 Spatiality
 Spandrel
 Spanish architecture
 Spanish Baroque architecture
 Spanish Colonial architecture
 Spanish Colonial Revival architecture
 Spanish Gothic architecture
 Spanish Romanesque
 Sphaeristerium
 Spire
 Spire light
 Spite house
 Split-level home
 Springer
 Spolia
 Spur
 Spur castle
 Squinch
 Stabilization
 Staddle stones
 Stained glass
 Stair riser
 Staircase tower
 Stalinist architecture
 Stanchion
 Starchitect
 State architect
 State room
 Stavanger Renaissance
 Stave church
 Steeple
 Step pyramid
 Stepwell
 Stepped gable
 Stick style
 Stile Umbertino
 Stillicidium
 Still room
 Stilt house
 Stilt tower
 Stilts
 Stoa
 Stone ender
 Stoop
 Storybook house
 Strap footing
 Strapwork
 Streamline Moderne
 Stripped Classicism
 Structuralism
 Structures built by animals
 Studio apartment
 Stupa
 Style Sapin
 Stylobate
 Sudatorium
 Sundanese traditional house
 Sudano-Sahelian architecture
 Sukanasa
 Sukiya-zukuri
 Sumbanese traditional house
 Summer architecture
 Sumiyoshi-zukuri
 Sunburst
 Sunken courtyard
 Sunroom
 Suntop Homes
 Superposed order
 Suprematism
 Surau
 Suspensura
 Sustainable architecture
 Svan towers
 Swahili architecture
 Swiss Chalet Revival architecture
 Swiss chalet style
 Symbolism of domes

T 

 Taberna
 Tablinum
 Tadelakt
 Taenia
 Tahōtō
 Taisha-zukuri
 Tajug
 Talud-tablero
 Tambo
 Tambour
 Tas-de-charge
 Tatar mosque
 Technical drawing
 Teito
 Telamon
 Temazcal
 Temple
 Templon
 Tenaille
 Tenement
 Tenshu
 Tensile structure
 Tension member
 Teocalli
 Tepidarium
 Term
 Terrace
 Terraced house
 Terraced houses in Australia
 Terraced houses in the United Kingdom
 Terreplein
 Territorial Style
 Territorial Revival architecture
 Tessellated roof
 Tetraconch
 Tetrapylon
 Thai temple art and architecture
 The 20th-Century Architecture of Frank Lloyd Wright
 Thin-shell structure
 Tholobate
 Tholos
 Three hares
 Tibetan Buddhist architecture
 Tidewater architecture
 Tie
 Tiltyard
 Timber framing
 Timber roof truss
 Timeline of architectural styles
 Timeline of architectural styles 1750–1900
 Timeline of Art Nouveau
 Timeline of Italian architecture
 Tin ceiling
 Tiny house movement
 Tokyō
 Toll castle
 Tongkonan
 Tong lau
 Tulou
 Torana
 Torii
 Torp
 Totalitarian architecture
 Tourelle
 Tower
 Tower blocks in Great Britain
 Tower castle
 Tower house
 Tower houses in Britain and Ireland
 Tower houses in the Balkans
 Townhouse
 Townhouse (Great Britain)
 Tracery
 Trachelium
 Traditional architecture of Enggano
 Traditional Chinese house architecture
 Traditional Korean roof construction
 Traditional Persian residential architecture
 Traditional Thai house
 Traditionalist School
 Transept
 Transom
 Transverse rib
 Trefoil
 Trefoil arch
 Trellis
 Triadic pyramid
 Tribune
 Triclinium
 Trifora
 Triforium
 Triglyph
 Trilithon
 Trinitarian steeple
 Triodetic dome
 Triquetra
 Triumphal arch
 Trombe wall
 Trompe-l'œil
 Trophy of arms
 Trullo
 Trumeau
 Truss
 Truth to materials
 Truth window
 Tsumairi
 The Leeds Look
 Tudor architecture
 Tudor Revival architecture
 Türbe
 Turret
 Twig work
 Two-up two-down
 Tympanum

U 

 Ubaid house
 Ukrainian architecture
 Ukrainian Baroque
 Ultimate bungalow
 Uma
 Umayyad architecture
 Undercroft
 Unfinished building
 Universal design
 Upper Lusatian house
 Upright and Wing
 Urban canyon
 Urban castle
 Urban design
 Urban planning
 Urban planning in ancient Egypt
 Urban planning in Australia
 Urban planning in communist countries
 Urban planning in Nazi Germany
 Usonia
 Uthland-Frisian house

V 

 Vainakh tower architecture
 Valencian Art Nouveau
 Valencian Gothic
 Vancouver Special
 Vancouverism
 Vanderbilt houses
 Vastu shastra
 Vatadage
 Vault
 Velarium
 Vellar cupola
 Venereum
 Venetian door
 Venetian Gothic architecture
 Venetian Renaissance architecture
 Venetian window
 Venice Biennale of Architecture
 Ventilation
 Ventilation shaft
 Veranda
 Verify in field
 Vernacular architecture
 Vernacular architecture in Norway
 Vernacular architecture of the Carpathians
 Vernacular residential architecture of Western Sichuan
 Vesara
 Vestibule
 Viaduct
 Victorian architecture
 Victorian house
 Victorian restoration
 Victory column
 Viga
 Vihāra
 Vijayanagara architecture
 Viking ring fortress
 Villa
 Villa rustica
 Vimana
 Vineyard style
 Visigothic art and architecture
 Vitruvian module
 Vitruvian opening
 Vitruvian scroll
 Volume and displacement indicators for an architectural structure
 Volute
 Vomitorium
 Votive column
 Voussoir

W 

 Wada
 Waldlerhaus
 Wall
 Wall dormer
 Wall footing
 Walipini
 Wantilan
 Wat
 Watchtower
 Water castle
 Watergate
 Waterleaf
 Water table
 Water tower
 Wattle and daub
 Wayō
 Wealden hall house
 Weavers' cottage
 Weavers' windows
 Wedding-cake style
 Weep
 Well house
 Welsh Tower houses
 Wessobrunner School
 Western Chalukya architecture
 Western false front architecture
 Westwork
 Wetu
 Wharenui
 Whispering gallery
 Widow's walk
 Wilhelminism
 Wind brace
 Windcatcher
 Window
 Window blind
 Window sill
 Wing
 Wing wall
 Witch window
 Witches' stones
 World Architecture Festival
 World Architecture Survey
 WPA Rustic
 Wunderlich

X 

 Xylotechnigraphy
 Xystum
 Xystus

Y 

 Yagura
 Yakhchāl
 Yalı
 Yaodong
 Yeseria
 Yett

Z 

 Z-plan castle
 Zakopane Style
 Zarih
 Zellige
 Zenshūyō
 Zero carbon housing
 Zero-energy building
 Zingel
 Zoomorphic architecture
 Zoophorus
 Zvonnitsa
 Zwinger

Lists

 Architects
 Architects of supertall buildings
 Architectural historians
 Architecture schools
 Architectural styles
 Architecture awards
 Architecture criticism
 Architecture firms
 Architecture magazines
 Bizarre buildings
 Building types
 Buildings and structures
 Firsts in architecture
 Greek and Roman architectural records
 Historic houses
 House styles
 House types
 Largest domes
 Nonbuilding structure types
 Oldest known surviving buildings
 Professional architecture organizations 
 Tallest buildings
 Twisted buildings
 Visionary tall buildings and structures

Category
 :Category:Architecture

See also

 Outline of architecture
 Outline of classical architecture
 Table of years in architecture
 Timeline of architecture
 Glossary of architecture

Architecture topics
Architecture